Raymond Heard is a Canadian-South African journalist, editor, media executive and political strategist.  Heard is President of Toronto-based Heard-Cosgrove Communications, whose clients include some of Canada's largest companies. He is a contributor to Canada's National Post and the Huffington Post and appears on the CTV News Channel, CBC News Network, Global News and formerly appeared on the defunct Sun News Network as a political pundit.
In Washington, he covered the assassinations of Martin Luther King and Robert Kennedy in 1968, the Gemini and Apollo missions, the riots in Washington after Martin Luther King's assassination and was one of the first Western reporters to reach Lisbon on April 25, 1974, for the Carnation Revolution. In 1966, Heard gave Robert Kennedy ideas for his epic Ripple of Hope speech to anti-apartheid students at the University of Cape Town, which was read by Edward Kennedy at RFK's funeral service.

Early life and education
A white South African by birth, Heard, whose parents, George and Vida Heard, were prominent liberal journalists, was a political reporter for the Rand Daily Mail from 1955 until 1960. On the Mail, he disclosed that liberal members of the opposition United Party would break away to launch the Progressive Party. In 1960, Heard graduated with a BA Hons. in political science at the University of the Witwatersrand (Johannesburg) and then spent a year at Harvard on a Frank Knox Fellowship, where his teachers included Henry Kissinger and John Kenneth Galbraith. While there, he wrote an article on the political situation in his homeland for The Harvard Crimson in which he described apartheid as "a combination of hatred, fear, and ignorance." Before leaving for Harvard, his last major assignment was covering the aftermath to the Sharpeviile massacre in which white police shot dead some 70 peaceful black demonstrators.

Career
An opponent of the apartheid regime, he left South Africa in 1962 and immigrated to Canada where he found a job with the Montreal Star. He served as the newspaper's White House correspondent, and a correspondent for The Observer of London and the South African Morning Group, from 1963 until 1973, when he became Editor of the London Observer Foreign News Service.

In 1976, he returned to the Montreal Star as Managing Editor, with responsibility for all content, and remained with the newspaper until it closed in 1979 after a crippling 11-month printers' strike. Heard then moved to the Global Television Network where he served as vice president, news and current affairs, until 1987 when he accepted a position as communications director for Liberal leader John Turner. During the 2008 federal election he endorsed his friend Conservative Peter Kent's winning candidacy for Parliament.

From 1990 until 2000, Heard was the senior adviser, media and speech-writing, to two Chairmen and CEOs of Royal Bank of Canada, Allan Taylor and John Cleghorn. As the adviser to Cleghorn during the abortive effort to merge Royal Bank and Bank of Montreal in 1998, Heard played the role of devil's advocate, warning that the merger would be denied by the Liberal government unless the banks did more to explain why the merger would benefit customers. In 2000, he launched Heard-Cosgrove Communications.

After Nelson Mandela's death, Heard was interviewed about his contacts with Mandela dating back to 1955, on CTV, CBC, Global and Sun News, and wrote articles for the National Post and Ottawa Citizen on Mandela and his links with Canada.

In 1975, the Royal Humane Society honoured Heard, an avid surfer since boyhood, for saving the life of a woman bather at Land's End, Cornwall. The award was accepted by his daughter, Josephine Robson of London, who had seen the woman being swept out in heavy surf hugging a plastic float. Heard straddled the woman over his long surfboard to reach the shore.

In early 2010, a consortium made up of Heard, Jerry Grafstein, Beryl Wajsman and Diane Francis announced a bid, which proved unsuccessful, to purchase the National Post, Ottawa Citizen and Montreal Gazette from the floundering CanWest media conglomerate.

Personal life
Heard is married to the Canadian journalist, Gillian Cosgrove and they have a daughter, Jennifer, a 2010 political science honours graduate from Guelph University, who died aged 28 in Toronto after a seizure on June 12, 2015. He has two children, Josephine Robson of London, and Antony Heard of Ottawa, from his first marriage to Susan Lewis (now Lady Susan Steyn).

Heard's younger brother, Anthony Heard, remained in South Africa and served as editor in chief of liberal The Cape Times for many years until he was dismissed after breaking the apartheid laws in 1986 by publishing his interview with Oliver Tambo, the exiled leader of the African National Congress (ANC). When Nelson Mandela became President of the new, democratic South Africa, Anthony Heard became an adviser in The Presidency, serving until 2010.

Heard's father George was a popular radical journalist with the Rand Daily Mail in the 1930s and 1940s, who exposed Nazi sympathisers and security breaches in the government-run South African Broadcasting Corporation (SABC). He joined the South African Navy in 1942, and disappeared in full uniform in Cape Town after VE Day in 1945.  It was later discovered that Heard, who was apparently number two on the death list of the Afrikaner Broederbond underground, had been kidnapped and murdered to prevent him from launching a post-war newspaper that would advocate a new, non-racial country.

References

1935 births
Living people
South African emigrants to Canada
South African journalists
Canadian newspaper editors
Canadian male journalists
Canadian political consultants
Canadian television executives
The Harvard Crimson people
White South African people
South African people of British descent